The Lake Placid funnel wolf spider (Sosippus placidus) is a species of spider in the family Lycosidae. It is endemic to the United States.

References

Lycosidae
Endemic fauna of the United States
Spiders of the United States
Taxonomy articles created by Polbot